Dedication is an album by American jazz pianist Mal Waldron and bassist David Friesen recorded in 1985 and released by the Italian Soul Note label.

Reception
The Allmusic review awarded the album 3 stars.

Track listing 
All compositions by Mal Waldron except as indicated
 "Dedication" (David Friesen, Mal Waldron) — 10:02 
 "All God's Chillun Got Rhythm" (Bronislaw Kaper, Walter Jurmann, Gus Kahn) — 6:05 
 "It Never Entered My Mind" (Lorenz Hart, Richard Rodgers) — 8:27 
 "Rhythmics" — 13:29 
 "Mowgly the Cat" — 5:00 
 "Tapestry" (Friesen) — 3:59 
 "Batik" (Friesen) — 6:01 
Recorded in Milan, Italy on November 18, 1985

Personnel 
 Mal Waldron — piano 
 David Friesen — bass

References 

Black Saint/Soul Note albums
Mal Waldron albums
David Friesen albums
1988 albums